A Romance of the Air is a 1918 American silent drama film based on the book En L'air (1918), by Bert Hall, one of America's first combat aviators, flying with the famed Lafayette Escadrille in France before the United States entered World War I. Directed by Harry Revier, the film was heavily influenced by the exploits of Hall, who was featured in the film and took an active role in promoting and marketing A Romance of the Air.

Plot
Flying with the French Lafayette Escadrille in World War I, American ace, Lieutenant Bert Hall (Bert Hall), is wounded in an aerial battle and forced to land behind enemy lines. After finding his German opponent dead, Hall exchanges uniforms with him and is taken to a German hospital to recover.

In the hospital, Hall meets Edith Day (Edith Day), an old sweetheart from Kentucky. She was unable to escape Berlin when the war broke out. The pair are accompanied by Day's best friend, the Countess of Moravia (Florence Billings), who claims sympathy with the Allied cause. The countess, however, is actually a German spy.

After stealing a German aircraft, the group escape to France. Once the true motives of the countess are revealed, Hall is accused of betraying the French government. After a trial by military tribunal, he is sentenced to be shot, but his American lover uncovers evidence that saves him at the last moment.

Exonerated, Hall dedicates himself to destroying the network of spies run by the Countess.

Cast

 Bert Hall as himself (as Lieutenant Bert Hall)
 Edith Day as American girl
 Florence Billings as Countess of Moravia
 Stuart Holmes as Archduke of Moravia
 Herbert Standing as Maj. William Thaw
 Brian Darley as Gen. Montaigne
 Tom Burrough as Col. DuBois
 Joseph Lertora as Lt. Le Roy
 Franklin B. Coates as Herbert Stair
 Emma Campbell as Madame Dumont
 Emil Hoch as Gen. von Hoch
 Warner Richmond as undetermined role, possibly Herbert Stair

Production
The aerial scenes in A Romance of the Air were flown by Bert Hall at the Thomas-Morse Aircraft Corporation airfield in New York. The aircraft that were used were Thomas-Morse S-4s that were painted to depict French aircraft. The production was filmed with the cooperation of the War Department. Although mainly a dramatization of the aerial battles over France, A Romance of the Air also used newsreel footage of military aircraft.

Reception
Aviation film historian Michael Paris in From the Wright Brothers to Top Gun: Aviation, Nationalism, and Popular Cinema (1995), described the "grandiose launch" of A Romance of the Air, that was coupled to only a 'moderately successful" run. At the premiere and after, during the initial release of the film, Hall made personal appearances on stage, in New York theaters to promote the film.

Although Hall's appearances were unique and well-received by the audiences, film reviewer Hal Erickson, notes, "... Moving Picture World was not quite so chivalrous: 'Lieutenant Hall rings true, but his story does not'."

References

Notes

Citations

Bibliography

 Farmer, James H. Celluloid Wings: The Impact of Movies on Aviation. Blue Ridge Summit, Pennsylvania: Tab Books Inc., 1984. .
 Paris, Michael. From the Wright Brothers to Top Gun: Aviation, Nationalism, and Popular Cinema. Manchester, UK: Manchester University Press, 1995. .
 Pendo, Stephen. Aviation in the Cinema. Lanham, Maryland: Scarecrow Press, 1985. .
 Wynne, H. Hugh. The Motion Picture Stunt Pilots and Hollywood's Classic Aviation Movies. Missoula, Montana: Pictorial Histories Publishing Co., 1987. .

External links
 
 
 

1918 films
American aviation films
1910s adventure drama films
American silent feature films
American black-and-white films
Films directed by Harry Revier
American adventure drama films
1918 drama films
1910s American films
Silent American drama films
Silent adventure films